The Corps of Firefighters of Catalonia (in Catalan: Cos de Bombers de la Generalitat de Catalunya) is the fire department of Catalonia, Spain. The body was established on June 27, 1980, shortly after the second restoration of the Government of Catalonia. It has responsibility managing all tasks related to firefighting, fire prevention, civil protection, maritime rescue, and traffic accidents.

The corps is part of the Ministry of the Interior of Catalonia, led by Joan Ignasi Elena, and have a hierarchical chain of command. The body has 149 stations, which are distributed in 7 emergency regions: Center, Girona, Lleida, Metropolitan North, Metropolitan South, Tarragona and Terres de l'Ebre.

In recognition of the service and the work carried out, the body was awarded the Gold Medal of the Generalitat of Catalonia on 11 September 2009.

Tasks 

According to the Law 9/2010, the Firefighters of Catalonia have the following tasks:
 Fire extinguishing while trying to minimise damage, both personal and material.
 Develop prevention activities to avoid fires and accidents.
 Study and investigate techniques, facilities and systems to increase fire protection.
 Participate in civil protection operations.
 Perform rescue tasks in difficult access rivers and mountains.
 Investigate and analyse the accidents under their jurisdiction.
 Provide information and formative activities for the general public.
 Act in service of public interest.
 Other actions stipulated in the current legislation documents.

See also 
 Guàrdia Urbana de Barcelona
 Mossos d'Esquadra

References

Bibliography

External links 

 

1980 establishments in Catalonia
Fire departments
Organisations based in Catalonia
Government agencies established in 1980